The 2006 Asian Taekwondo Championships are the 17th edition of the Asian Taekwondo Championships, and were held in Bangkok, Thailand from April 21 to April 23, 2006.

Medal summary

Men

Women

Medal table

External links
 www.wtf.org 
 www.asiantaekwondounion.org 

Asian Championships
Asian Taekwondo Championships
Asian Taekwondo Championships
Taekwondo Championships